Fairlawn Mansion is a 4-story, 42 room Victorian House in Superior, Wisconsin. The mansion was built as a residence for former three-time mayor of Superior and lumber baron, Martin Pattison and his family. The residence, which was completed in 1891, cost over $150,000, the equivalent of $3 million now. Pattison and his family lived in the residence until 1918, after which, it became used as a Children's Home from 1920 to 1962. The building's floors were completely restored, and since the 1990s, the building has been used as a tourist attraction.

References

Superior, Wisconsin
Houses completed in 1891
1891 establishments in Wisconsin